John Horrocks may refer to:
 John Horrocks (politician) (1768–1804), British cotton manufacturer and Member of Parliament
 John Horrocks (fisherman) (1816–1881), Edinburgh-born founder of modern fly fishing in Europe
 John Ainsworth Horrocks (1818–1846), South Australian explorer
 John Horrocks (died 2001), a member of English band Poloroid